Heinrich John Rickert (25 May 1863 – 25 July 1936) was a German philosopher, one of the leading neo-Kantians.

Life
Rickert was born in Danzig, Prussia (now Gdańsk, Poland) to the journalist and later politician Heinrich Edwin Rickert and Annette née Stoddart. He was professor of philosophy at the University of Freiburg (1894–1915) and Heidelberg (1915–1932).

He died in Heidelberg, Germany.

Philosophy

He is known for his discussion of a qualitative distinction held to be made between historical and scientific facts. Contrary to philosophers like Nietzsche and Bergson, Rickert emphasized that values demand a distance from life, and that what Bergson, Dilthey or Simmel called "vital values" were not true values.

Rickert's philosophy was an important influence on the work of sociologist Max Weber.  Weber is said to have borrowed much of his methodology, including the concept of the ideal type, from Rickert's work. Also, Martin Heidegger started out his academic career as Rickert's assistant, graduated with him and then wrote his habilitation thesis under Rickert.

Charles R. Bambach writes:
In his work Rickert, like Dilthey, intended to offer a unifying theory of knowledge which, although accepting a division between science and history or Natur and Geist, overcame this division in a new philosophical method. For Dilthey the method was wedded to hermeneutics; for Rickert it was the transcendental method of Kant.

Rickert, with Wilhelm Windelband, led the so-called Baden school of neo-Kantians.

Works
 Zur Lehre von der Definition [On the Theory of Definition] (1888) (doctoral thesis). Center for Research libraries, crl.edu 2nd. ed., 1915. 3rd ed., 1929. 
 Der Gegenstand der Erkenntnis: ein Beitrag zum Problem der philosophischen Transcendenz (1892). Google (UCal)
 2nd ed., 1904: Der Gegenstand der Erkenntnis: Einführung in die Transzendentalphilosophie. Google (UMich)
 Die Grenzen der naturwissenschaftlichen Begriffsbildung (1896–1902). 2 volumes. Google (NYPL) 2nd ed., 1913.
  The Limits of Concept Formation in Natural Science (1986). (Tr. Guy Oakes.) 
 Fichtes Atheismusstreit und die kantische Philosophie (1899). Google (UCal) IA (UToronto)
 Kulturwissenschaft und Naturwissenschaft (1899). 6th/7th revised and expanded ed., 1926.
  Science and history: A critique of positivist epistemology (1962). (Tr. George Reisman.)
 "Geschichtsphilosophie" in Die Philosophie im Beginn des zwanzigsten Jahrhunderts (1905). 2 volumes. Vol. 2, pp. 51–135
 Die Probleme der Geschichtsphilosophie: eine Einführung, 3rd ed., 1924. New ed.: Celtis Verlag, Berlin 2013, 
 Wilhelm Windelband (1915).
 Die Philosophie des Lebens: Darstellung und Kritik der philosophischen Modeströmungen unserer Zeit (1920). IA (UToronto) 2nd ed., 1922.
 Allgemeine Grundlegung der Philosophie (1921). [System der Philosophie vol. 1]
 Kant als Philosoph der modernen Kultur (1924).
 Über die Welt der Erfahrung (1927).
 Die Logik des Prädikats und das Problem der Ontologie (1930).
 Die Heidelberger Tradition in der Deutschen Philosophie (1931).
 Goethes Faust (1932).
 Grundprobleme der Philosophie: Methodologie, Ontologie, Anthropologie (1934). 
 Unmittelbarkeit und Sinndeutung (1939).

Notes

References

Further reading
 Christian Krijnen. Nachmetaphysischer Sinn. Eine problemgeschichtliche und systematische Studie zu den Prinzipien der Wertphilosophie Heinrich Rickerts. Würzburg 2001. .
 Dewalque, Arnaud. Être et jugement. La fondation de l’ontologie chez Heinrich Rickert, Hildesheim: Georg Olms, coll. « Europaea Memoria », 2010. .
 Kupriyanov V. "Teleology as a method of historical cognition in H. Rickert's philosophy," SGEM2015 Conference Proceedings, 2015 (Vol. 1, Book 3, pp. 697–702). 
 Mayeda, Graham. 2008. "Is there a Method to Chance? Contrasting Kuki Shūzō’s Phenomenological Methodology in The Problem of Contingency with that of his Contemporaries Wilhelm Windelband and Heinrich Rickert." In Victor S. Hori and Melissa Anne-Marie Curley (eds.), Frontiers of Japanese Philosophy II: Neglected Themes and Hidden Variations (Nagoya, Japan: Nanzan Institute for Religion and Culture).
 Zijderveld, Anton C. Rickert's Relevance. The Ontological Nature and Epistemological Functions of Values. Leiden, Brill 2006. .

References

1863 births
1936 deaths
19th-century essayists
19th-century German non-fiction writers
19th-century German philosophers
20th-century essayists
20th-century German non-fiction writers
20th-century German philosophers
Continental philosophers
Epistemologists
German male essayists
German male non-fiction writers
Academic staff of Heidelberg University
Humboldt University of Berlin alumni
Kantian philosophers
Members of the Prussian Academy of Sciences
Metaphysicians
Ontologists
People from the Province of Prussia
Philosophers of education
Philosophers of history
Philosophers of logic
Philosophers of mind
Philosophers of science
Philosophers of social science
Philosophy academics
Philosophy writers
Academic staff of the University of Freiburg
University of Strasbourg alumni
Writers from Gdańsk